Igor Nikolayevich Zuborenko (born 20 February 1966) is a Russian rower. He competed at the 1988 Summer Olympics in Seoul with the men's coxless pair where they came sixth.

References

1966 births
Living people 
Russian male rowers
Olympic rowers of the Soviet Union
Rowers at the 1988 Summer Olympics
People from Mogilev